Jorge Brovetto (14 February 1933 – 8 June 2019) was a Uruguayan chemical engineer, academic and politician.

He successively served as President of the Broad Front, as Rector of the University of the Republic, and as Minister of Education and Culture.

References

External links

1933 births
2019 deaths
People from Montevideo
University of the Republic (Uruguay) alumni
Uruguayan chemical engineers
University of the Republic (Uruguay) rectors
Broad Front (Uruguay) politicians
Education and Culture Ministers of Uruguay